Hutchison may refer to:

Places in the United States
 Hutchison, Kentucky
 Hutchison, Missouri
Hutchison, Virginia

People
Alexander Richard Hamilton Hutchison, British Royal Marines officer
Ambrose K. Hutchison (1856–1932), Hawaiian resident leader of the leper settlement of Kalaupapa
Andrew Hutchison (b. 1938), Primate of the Anglican Church of Canada
Anna Hutchison (b. 1986), New Zealand actress
Balfour Oliphant Hutchison (1889–1967), Lieutenant-General in the British Army in World War II and younger brother of Robert Hutchison
Bruce Hutchison (1901–1992), Canadian author and journalist
Chuck Hutchison (born 1948), American football player
Claude B. Hutchison (1885–1980), American botanist and educator
Craig Hutchison (swimmer) (b. 1975), Canadian freestyle swimmer
Don Hutchison (b. 1971), English football player
Doug Hutchison (b. 1960), American actor
Drew Hutchison (b. 1990), American baseball player
Drew Hutchison (rugby league) (b. 1995), Australian rugby player
Ferdinand William Hutchison (1819–1893), British physician and politician in the Kingdom of Hawaii
Fiona Hutchison (b. 1960), British-American actress
Gus Hutchison (b. 1937), Formula-One driver
Jane Campbell Hutchison (1932–2020), American art historian
Jock Hutchison  (1884–1977), Scottish-American, golfer
John Hutchison (sculptor) (1832–1910), Scottish sculptor
Kathleen Hutchison, British television producer
Kay Bailey Hutchison (b. 1943), United States senator
Mark Hutchison, Nevada State Senator and Lieutenant Governor of Nevada
Miller Reese Hutchison (1876–1944), American electrical engineer and inventor
Patrick Hutchison (1741–1802), Presbyterian minister
Paul Hutchison, New Zealand politician
Ralph Cooper Hutchison (1898–1966), president of Washington & Jefferson College and Lafayette College
Robert Hutchison, 1st Baron Hutchison of Montrose (1873–1950), British Major General in World War I
Sir Robert Hutchison, 1st Baronet of Thurle (1871–1960) of the Hutchison Baronets, Scottish physician 
Ron Hutchison, Canadian professional wrestler, trainer and promoter
Ruby Hutchison, Australian politician
Sidney Hutchison, British art historian
Terence Wilmot Hutchison (1912–2007), British economist
Thomas Hutchinson (governor) (1711 – 1780), colonial Governor of Massachusetts
Thomas Setzer Hutchison (1875–1936), American military officer, volunteer officer in Greece, police commissioner, and civil reformer
Tommy Hutchison (b. 1947), Scottish football player
William Hutchison (disambiguation), several people

Other uses
Hutchison School, Memphis, Tennessee
Hutchison Whampoa, a company based in Hong Kong, now part of CK Hutchison Holdings
 Hutchison Telecommunications International Limited, or known as "Hutchison Telecom", a telecommunications services provider and a subsidiary of CK Hutchison Holdings
 Hutchison Ports

See also
Hutch (disambiguation)
Hutcherson
Hutcheson
Hutchinson (disambiguation)

English-language surnames